The February 2022 San Francisco special election (formally, the February 15, 2022, Consolidated Special Municipal Election) was held on February 15, 2022, in San Francisco. The races on the ballot include assessor-recorder; and three ballot measures to recall members of the school board. Some voters in this election also voted in the special primary election for the 17th State Assembly district on the same ballot.

Assessor-Recorder 
In January 2021, Mayor London Breed appointed Joaquin Torres to be Assessor-Recorder, after Carmen Chu resigned the position to become City Administrator. Joaquin Torres was the only candidate who registered before the deadline of November 19, 2021.

Proposition A: Recall of Board of Education Member Alison Collins 

Proposition A is a recall election to remove Board of Education member Alison Collins from office.

Proposition B: Recall of Board of Education Member Gabriela Lopez 

Proposition B is a recall election to remove Board of Education member Gabriela Lopez from office.

Proposition C: Recall of Board of Education Member Faauuga Moliga 

Proposition C is a recall election to remove Board of Education member Faauuga Moliga from office.

References

External links
 San Francisco Department of Elections

San Francisco
2022
Elections
San Francisco
February 2022 events in the United States